A mukim is the second-level administrative division of Brunei, and the primary subdivision of a district. There are 39 mukims in the country. A mukim encompasses a number of villages ( or ). Mukims are administered by the district office of the district where they are located.

List of mukims

References 

Subdivisions of Brunei
Brunei, Mukims
Brunei 2
Mukims, Brunei
Brunei geography-related lists